The 2013 season was Incheon United's ninth season in the K-League in South Korea. Incheon United competed in K League Classic and Korean FA Cup. It also marked the tenth anniversary of the club's founding and Kim Bong-Gil's first full season as manager.

Current squad

Out on loan

Transfers

In

Out

Coaching staff

Senior coaching staff

Youth coaching staff

Match results

K-League
All times are Korea Standard Time (KST) – UTC+9

League table

Results summary

Results by round

Korean FA Cup

Squad statistics

Appearances
Statistics accurate as of match played 27 June 2012

Goals

Assists

Discipline

References

South Korean football clubs 2013 season
2013